The Claremont Hotel is a historic hotel on Claremont Road in Southwest Harbor, Maine.  Built in 1883, the main hotel building is one of the only 19th-century hotels to survive on Mount Desert Island.  The hotel facilities include 24 rooms in the main hotel, six rooms in the Phillips House, and 14 housekeeping cottages on a  parcel overlooking Somes Sound.

Main building
The main building of the Claremont was built in 1883 by Jesse Pease, a retired sea captain, and was one of the first large hotels to be built on Mount Desert Island.  It is a -story wood-frame structure, finished in clapboards, with a cross-gabled hip roof and a stone foundation.  The main (west-facing) facade is seven bays wide, with a simple port-cochere near the south end providing entrance to the building.  A single-story porch wraps around the south and east facades (the latter facing Somes Sound).  From the eastern facade a broad lawn extends down to the waterfront, where there is a boathouse.  The interior has been modernized, but with attention to maintaining original Victorian features.  The building was listed on the National Register of Historic Places in 1978.  The building currently has 24 private rooms, as well as Xanthus, the hotel's restaurant.

The hotel was run by Jesse Pease and his wife until his death in 1900.  She continued to operate the hotel until her death in 1917, but sold the property in 1908 to Joseph Phillips, a local doctor.  Phillips and later his son ran the property until 1971.

Cabins
The property includes fourteen cabins, sited to give views of Somes Sound.  They are stylistically varied, with some built in the style of traditional Maine log cabins, and others in modern architectural styles.  Most provide accommodations for up to four guests, although some only have space for two, and the Rowse House accommodates eight.  The cottages are available between May and October for daily rentals; the Rowse House is rented by the week.

See also
National Register of Historic Places listings in Hancock County, Maine

References

Further reading
Cole, John N., "Claremont hotel, Southwest Harbor, Maine : A Landmark's Narrative History" (1994)

External links
The Claremont Hotel web site

Commercial buildings on the National Register of Historic Places in Maine
Victorian architecture in Maine
Hotel buildings completed in 1883
Buildings and structures in Hancock County, Maine
Hotels in Maine
National Register of Historic Places in Hancock County, Maine
1883 establishments in Maine
Hotels established in 1883